Soul Discharge is a 1989 album by rock band Boredoms. It was named the 89th greatest album of the 1980s by Pitchfork on the site's 2002 list of the best albums of the decade.

Track listing

Soul Discharge
Original Selfish Records LP release (1989)

Soul Discharge '99

Soul Discharge/Early Boredoms
Despite being a CD release, the songs are divided into only two tracks.

References

1989 albums
Boredoms albums